Time Will Pronounce: The 1992 Commissions is a 1993 album by Michael Nyman, his eighteenth release.  Nyman does not perform on the album, but he composed all the music, produced it, and wrote the liner notes.  The album contains four compositions, each on a separate track.  The album is dedicated to the memory of Tony Simons, "friend, manager, and generous and courageous survivor."  The album is named for the second and longest of the four works, the only one featuring a former member of the Michael Nyman Band, Elisabeth Perry.

Self-laudatory hymn of Inanna and her omnipotence
13:55

James Bowman, countertenor

Fretwork
William Hunt, bass viol
Richard Campbell, treble viol
Julia Hodgson, tenor viol
Wendy Gillespie, treble viol
Richard Boothby, bass viol
Assistant engineers:  Alex Marcou & David Forty

Inanna is the Queen of the Heavens in the Sumerian religion.  Nyman found the text on February 12, 1992 in a translation by Samuel Noah Kramer in Ancient Near Eastern Texts Relating to the Old Testament edited by James B. Pritchard (3rd edition with supplement, Princeton University Press, 1969), in the personal library of an Armenian friend.  In the hymn, Inanna speaks proudly of all that her father, Enlil, has given her, and it takes the form of a list.  Its audacity, shamelessness, and repetitive structure appealed to him, and thought it would be suitable for James Bowman's voice.  He became even more interested in setting the work when he learned that Inanna is well-known deity embraced by many feminists, and not obscure, as he had initially thought.  Indeed, she superseded all Sumerian deities, male or female, by the end of the Sumerian civilization.  In spite of the last stanza of the piece being the most repetitive, Nyman chose to use cadential diversity rather than repetition.

The work was first performed June 11, 1992 at Christ Church, Spitalfields in London.  The recording was made the following day at St. Augustine's Church.

Time will pronounce
20:35

Trio of London
Elisabeth Perry, violin
Melissa Phelps, cello
Julian Jacobson, piano
Assistant engineer:  Chris Ludwinski

The title of Time will pronounce is derived from  the closing lines of Joseph Brodsky's "Bosnia Tune."  Nyman uses the word "generally" five times in describing the nature of the work—violin and cello independent of piano, alternating tempi without motivation, use of harmonics, and so on.  The piece premiered July 14 at the Pittville Pump Room, Cheltenham.

The convertibility of lute strings
15:06

Virginia Black, harpsichord

Engineered by Tony Falkner

Commissioned by neurologist Anthony Roberts for Virginia Black, a fellow student with whom Nyman studied harpsichord at the Royal Academy of Music, the title refers to a late sixteenth century practice to which Christopher Marlowe refers in his book, The Reckoning on the death of Christopher Marlowe, in which lute strings were popular to use as a commodity with moneylenders when money was not available, but Nyman states that this is completely irrelevant to the piece, and that his only musical reference in it is to the closing section of his own opera, The Man Who Mistook His Wife for a Hat, because the piece was commissioned by a neurologist.

This work was first performed November 19 at the Purcell Room in London, and was recorded at St. Michael's Church in Highgate two days later.

For John Cage
14:23

London Brass
Mark Bennett, trumpet
Tony Cross, trumpet
Anne McAneney, trumpet, flugelhorn
Chris Pigram, trumpet, flugelhorn
Richard Bissill, horn
Lindsay Schilling, trombone
Richard Edwards, trombone
David Purser, trombone, euphonium
David Stewart, bass trombone
Oren Marshall, tuba
Assistant engineer: Tristan Powers

Mark Bennett was a guest performer on The Kiss and Other Movements.  The piece is named because the work was completed on August 12, 1992, and Nyman read in the newspaper the following day that John Cage had died, although Cage's influence is not directly felt in the piece, and Nyman acknowledges the piece might not be to his taste.  On earlier sheets of the work, he noted the deaths of Miles Davis (who died September 29, the day it was begun) and Ástor Piazzolla.  The working title for the piece has been "Canons, chorales and waltzes," but Nyman rejected this because there was only one canon, one waltz, and no chorales.  The work features a non-simultaneous multiplicity of the group operating more like ensembles that constantly change.

This piece was first performed November 16 at Norton Knatchbull School in Ashford, Kent, and was recorded five days later at Abbey Road Studios.

Album credits
Produced by Michael Nyman and Michael J. Dutton
Engineered by Michael J. Dutton (1, 2, and 4)
Tape editors: Michael Nyman & Michael J. Dutton
Mixed and edited at Kitsch Studios, Brussels
Assistant engineers/mixing/editing (Brussels):  Bruno Stevens, Denis Wauthy, Sebastian Lambrechts
Final editing and mastering on the Sonic Solutions Mastering System at Abbey Road Studios by Peter Mew
P & Q encoding by Peter R. Vince at Abbey Road Studios
Publishers: Chester Music Ltd./Kelly Music Ltd.
Art direction: David Smart
Photographic art direction and design: Joe Ewart for Society
Cover photo: John Bellars
Artist representative: Nigel Barr

References

1993 albums
Michael Nyman albums